Doubt is a mental state.

Doubt may also refer to:

Music 

 Doubt (album), released in 1991 by British rock band Jesus Jones
 "Doubt" (Mary J. Blige song), 2014
 "Doubt" (Delphic song), 2010
 "Doubt", a song by Twenty One Pilots from their album Blurryface
 "Doubt", a song by hide from 50% & 50%

Film 

 Doubtful (film), a 2017 Israeli film
 Doubt (2009 film), a 2009 Iranian film
 Doubt (2008 film), a 2008 American film starring Philip Seymour Hoffman and Meryl Streep, adapted from the Shanley play
 Doubt (2003 film) (Duda), a 2003 Philippine film released in the Tagalog language
 Doubt (1951 film), a 1951 Spanish drama film

Other 

 Doubt (American TV series), starring Katherine Heigl and Laverne Cox
 Doubt (Arabic TV series)
 Doubt (play), by John Patrick Shanley
 Doubt (opera), a 2013 American opera
 Doubt!!, a 2000 manga series published by Kaneyoshi Izumi
 Doubt (horror manga), published by Yoshiki Tonogai
 Doubt (magazine), published by the Fortean Society

See also 

 No Doubt (disambiguation)
 Question mark